Krasnoramenye is a rural locality (a village) in Penkinskoye Rural Settlement, Kameshkovsky District, Vladimir Oblast, Russia. The population was 16 as of 2010.

Geography 
Krasnoramenye is located on the Klyazma River, 32 km south of Kameshkovo (the district's administrative centre) by road. Penkino is the nearest rural locality.

References 

Rural localities in Kameshkovsky District